Brian mac Donchadha Ó Dubha was elected by the Dean and Chapter of the diocese of Killala to be Bishop of Killala (possibly in 1383), though it appears he never assumed office.

References

14th-century Roman Catholic bishops in Ireland
Bishops of Killala